Case IH Axial Flow Combines (also known as rotary harvesters) are a type of combine harvester that has been manufactured by International Harvester, and later Case International, Case Corporation and CNH Global, used by farmers to harvest a wide range of grains around the world.

Introduced in 1977, these harvesters marked a departure from traditional combine harvester design, in that threshing and separation was performed mainly by a rotor, as opposed to the drum and straw walker type models used previously.  This is shown in the image at right, where the bulk of the processing area is devoted to a cylinder, that spins and threshes grain from the grain heads and allows for far greater capacity than the previous drum and walker design of harvester.  This increase in capacity has led to a significant productivity increase of harvesters and therefore farmers who use them.

The rotary design by International Harvester was the first of its kind to be mass-produced and its patent over the design gave IH a competitive advantage over its rivals, including John Deere, Massey Ferguson, New Holland and others.

Models

The following is a summary of the model development of the Case IH harvester to the present day.

The 14 series 
International Harvester had launched the 15 series of conventional combine harvesters in 1968.  In 1977, after extensive engineering efforts and a bottom up design, IH released the 1440 and 1460 models of harvester.  In 1978, the larger model 1480 was released, as well as the specialty models 1470 (for hillside operation), and the 1482, designed to be pulled behind a tractor with PTO capability.  Further models were introduced as the series was developed including the 1420 in 1980.

The 16 series 
In 1985, International Harvester and Case Corporation merged.

The 16 series was the first harvester series released by the new Case International and was an upgrade to the 14 series rather than a replacement.   All models of the 14 series had 16 series equivalents, in the 1620, 1640, 1660, 1670, 1680 and 1682.

The 16-4/6/8 series 
Released in 1993, the 16 series was again upgraded to the 16-4/6/8 series.  Models included the 1644, 1666 and 1688, and incorporated many changes to improve processing capacity.

The 21 series 
Tenneco demerged CaseIH in 1995 and the new Case Corporation released the 21 series combine harvesters, comprising the 2144, 2166, 2188.  These models represented a significant step forward in the model design featuring improved operator comfort, higher power engines and a range of other productivity and user ease improvements.

The 23 series 
Making incremental improvements on the 21 series, the 23 series were quite similar to the 21 series featuring more upgrades to engine power and other improvements to harvester operation.  The series featured the 2344, 2366, 2377 and 2388 models. The 2377 was intended to replace the 2366, though the 2366 remained popular.

The 120 series 
In 1999, CaseIH and New Holland AG merged to form CNH Global.  As part of the post merger product simplification process, both harvester lines of CaseIH and New Holland were based on a common basic platform, with each model then customised to the features usually found on each harvester (e.g. cabin, external panelling, colouring, decals etc.).  These combine harvesters are manufactured in Grand Island, Nebraska

This series consisted of the 7120, 8120 and 9120 models and were based on a 5.4m2 (7120) and 6.5m2 (8120/9120) cleaning area.  Significant improvements were made to the design including replacing many chains and belts with hydraulic control, including the main rotor drive belt.  This hydraulic drive also allowed the fitting of an in cabin rotor reversing mechanism, allowing operators to reverse the entire rotor and feeder house in the event of a blockage.

The 88 series 
The 88 series continued the 23 series line in parallel to the 120 series, and consisted of the 5088, 6088 and 7088 models.  This series had 5.48m2 of separation area. The series was phased out of production in most markets until their last year of production in 2009.

The 130/230 series 
In 2012, the 130/230 series was released. It has a Tier 4a/Tier 4 interim engine emissions control.  This series has two sub-series with the difference based on total cleaning area.  The smaller sub-series uses a 5.9m2 cleaning area and consists of the 5130 (Class V), 6130 (Class VI) and 7130 (Class VII) models.  The larger sub-series uses a 6.1m2 cleaning area and consists of the 7230 (Class VII), 8230 (Class VIII) and 9230 (Class IX) models.

The 4000 series 

Based on the 66 series Axial-Flow harvesters, the 4000 series, 4077 and 4088 were produced from 2014 in CNH Industrial's Harbin plant in China.

The 9000 series 

These combine harvesters are among the most efficient in the world, specifically the 9240. Coming with a FPT engine, optional front crawler tracks, pipe lengths (20-50 feet), grain hopper size (14000-24100 litres), rear axel lengths (30-44 inches), multiple roter options for specific grain types, and a trailer hitch for a header trailer.

Further reading 
 ToyTractorShow.com Salutes 25 years of Axial-Flow Combines
 How the Axial-Flow Combine was developed under lock and key

References 

Combine harvesters
International Harvester vehicles